Morelia spilota, commonly known as the carpet python, is a large snake of the family Pythonidae found in Australia, New Guinea (Indonesia and Papua New Guinea), Bismarck Archipelago, and the northern Solomon Islands. Many subspecies are recognised; ITIS lists six, the Reptile Database six, and the IUCN eight.

Description

M. s. variegata is the smallest subspecies, typically  in length. However, one 3-year-old captive male M. s. mcdowelli, measured in Ireland, was found to exceed . Males are typically smaller than females; in some regions, females are up to four times heavier. The head is triangular with a conspicuous row of thermoreceptive labial pits.

The colouring of M. spilota is highly variable, ranging from olive to black with white or cream and gold markings. The patterning may be roughly diamond-shaped or have intricate markings made up of light and dark bands on a background of gray or a version of brown.

Reproduction
The species is oviparous, with females laying 10–50 eggs at a time. Afterward, females coil around the eggs to protect them and keep them warm through using muscular contractions to generate heat. This type of maternal care, which is typical for pythons, ceases once the hatchlings have emerged.

Behaviour
Differences in activity are noted throughout various subspecies; as a whole, the species is generally active during both daytime and nighttime, although the subspecies M. s. variegata is noted to be primarily nocturnal. Carpet pythons favor arboreal living conditions, although they can also be found on the ground, and they commonly use open spaces to bask.

Diet
Carpet pythons kill prey by constriction. Their diet consists mainly of small mammals, birds, and lizards. Incidents of carpet pythons devouring domestic cats and small dogs have been reported.

Distribution and habitat
The species is found throughout mainland Australia, with the exception of the arid centre and the western regions. It is widely distributed throughout the forest regions of Southwest Australia.  It is also found in Indonesia (southern Western New Guinea in Merauke Regency), Papua New Guinea (southern Western Province, the Port Moresby area of Central Province), and on Yule Island. The type locality given is "Nouvelle-Hollande" [Australia].

It occurs in a wide variety of habitats, from the rainforests of northeastern Queensland (M. s. cheynei) through the River Red Gum/Riverbox woodlands of the Murray and Darling Rivers (M. s. metcalfei), to the arid, treeless islands of the Nuyts Archipelago off the South Australian west coast (M. s. imbricata). It is also found in temperate grasslands with hot and dry weather. It is often found near human habitation, where it performs a useful service by eating rats and other vermin. M. spilota is known to occur in areas that receive snowfall.

Conservation
M. spilota is not threatened as a species. The nominate subspecies, M. s. spilota, is listed as threatened with extinction in Victoria. The subspecies M. s. imbricata is regarded as near threatened in Western Australia, due to loss of habitat.

Captivity
This species is a popular pet among snake enthusiasts. Some forms can be more irascible than others, such as M. s. mcdowelli and M. s. variegata. Forms that tend to be more even tempered include M. s. spilota and M. s. metcalfei.  Although they can be nippy as hatchlings, most grow into docile adults. However, care must be taken when feeding, as these snakes have a strong "feeding response" that can be mistaken for aggression.

The care requirements can be generalized for all subspecies. The subspecies M. s. spilota, the cold-weather diamond python, has some separate requirements and habits. As medium to large snakes, carpet pythons need a proportionately sized enclosure that allows for climbing as well as crawling around on the ground. They generally require moderately high basking temperature and moderate humidity. Captive specimens are normally fed live or frozen (defrosted to room temperature) rats or mice, but it is considered best practice to offer a varied diet which includes other types of rodents and birds to create more balanced nutrition. Young carpet pythons can be fed every 1–2 weeks, but adults have slower metabolisms and should be fed every 2–4 weeks depending on body condition.

With good care, the carpet python is capable of living up to 30 years.

Subspecies 
The geographic distribution and common names can be summarised as the following, although M. s. imbricata is missing:

Hybrids
 Morelia spilota X viridis

Naming and taxonomy
The first description of M. spilota was by Lacépède (1804), who placed it in the genus Coluber as Coluber spilotus. The species has since been described by various authors as containing a number of subspecies and hybrids; these have also been known by various informal names. The attempted arrangement of taxa in this, and other, Australasian Pythonidae has produced numerous synonyms. The discreet and roaming habits of this species have produced a low number of recorded specimens, giving inadequate sample numbers to support descriptions of a taxon's morphology. This is the case with proposed names which are sometimes cited, such as the Papuan Morelia spilota harrisoni (Hoser), despite being unaccepted or invalid. Common names are regional variants of carpet and diamond python or snake.

The following is an incomplete list of synonyms:
 [Coluber] Arges - Linnaeus, 1758
 [Coluber] Argus - Linnaeus, 1766
 Coluber spilotus - Lacépède, 1804
 [Python] punctatus - Merrem, 1820
 [Coluber (Natrix)] Argus - Merrem, 1820
 [Vipera (Echidna)] Spilotes - Merrem, 1820
 Python Peronii - Wagler, 1828
 Python spilotes - Gray In G. Grey, 1841
 Morelia punctata - Gray, 1842
 Morelia argus - A.M.C. Duméril & Bibron, 1844
 Morelia spilotes - Gray, 1849
 M[orelia]. argus var. fasciolata - Jan In Jan & Sordelli, 1864
 Python spilotes - Boulenger, 1893
 [Python spilotes spilotes] - Werner, 1909
 Python spilotes macrospila - Werner, 1909
 Morelia argus - Loveridge, 1934
 Morelia argus - Stull, 1935
 Morelia spilotes spilotes - Worrell, 1961
 Morelia argus argus - Stimson, 1969
 Python spilotes - McDowell, 1975
 [Python spilotus spilotus] - L.A. Smith, 1981
 Morelia spilota - Cogger, Cameron & Cogger, 1983
 Morelia spilota - Underwood & Stimson, 1990
 Morelia spilota spilota - Barker & Barker, 1994

References

Further reading

 Lacépède, B.G. 1804. Mémoire sur plusieurs animaux de la Nouvelle-Hollande dont la description n'a pas encore été publiée. Annales du Muséum National d'Histoire Naturelle, Paris 4: 184–211. (Coluber spilotus, p. 209.)
 Mattison, C. 1999. Snake. DK Publishing. .

External links

 DPIPWE (2012) Carpet Python (Morelia spilota) PDF — Detailed description and pest risk assessment — Department of Primary Industries, Parks, Water & Environment. Hobart, Tasmania.

Morelia (snake)
Snakes of Australia
Reptiles of Indonesia
Reptiles of Papua New Guinea
Reptiles described in 1804
Snakes of New Guinea